Navid Zargari is an electrical engineer at Rockwell Automation Canada in Cambridge, Ontario. He was named a Fellow of the Institute of Electrical and Electronics Engineers (IEEE) in 2015 for his contribution to medium-voltage drive technologies and applications.

References

Fellow Members of the IEEE
Living people
Year of birth missing (living people)
Place of birth missing (living people)